Alkalilacustris is a Gram-negative, aerobic and short-rod-shaped bacterial genus from the family Rhodobacteraceae with one known species (''Alkalilacustris brevis). Alkalilacustris brevis has been isolated from water from a soda lake in Jili in China.

References

Rhodobacteraceae
Bacteria genera
Taxa described in 2019
Monotypic bacteria genera